Alfredo Soressi (Piacenza, 1897 - Piacenza, 1982) was an Italian painter, eclectic in subjects.

Biography
Born in Mucinasso, frazione of Piacenza, in 1897, he initially trained under Francesco Ghittoni at the Istituto Gazzola of Piacenza, but then traveled to Milan to study at the Brera Academy under Mentessi, Bignami, and Pellini. After the First world war, he obtained a diploma as an architect, but for many years (1925 - 1958) he taught ornamentation at the Istituto Gazzola.

In his will, he left many of his works to the Galleria Ricci Oddi of Piacenza. Among his architectural works, he designed the Casa del mutilato in Piacenza, the Palazzo del Comune in Farini d’Olmo, and the Villaggio degli artisti in Bosconure.

Awards 

 1957: Mostra d'Arte Pura di Napoli, Naples gold medal 
 1958: Antibiennale, Rome gold medal

References

1897 births
1982 deaths
20th-century Italian painters
Italian male painters
People from Piacenza
19th-century Italian male artists
20th-century Italian male artists